The 1975 NCAA Division II basketball tournament involved 32 schools playing in a single-elimination tournament to determine the national champion of men's NCAA Division II college basketball as a culmination of the 1974–75 NCAA Division II men's basketball season. It was won by Old Dominion University and Old Dominion's Wilson Washington was the Most Outstanding Player.

Regional participants

*denotes tie

Regionals

New England - Waltham, Massachusetts
Location: Dana Center Host: Bentley College

Third Place - Hartford 102, Sacred Heart 91

East - Erie, Pennsylvania
Location: Hammermill Center Host: Gannon University

Third Place - Philadelphia U 80, Hartwick 75

South Central - New Orleans, Louisiana
Location: Human Performance Center Host: University of New Orleans

Third Place - Southern 103, West Georgia 98

West - Irvine, California
Location: Crawford Hall Host: University of California, Irvine

Third Place - UC Davis 84, UC Irvine 70

North Central - Grand Forks, North Dakota
Location: Hyslop Sports Center Host: University of North Dakota

Third Place - Augustana 71, Missouri-Rolla 64

South Atlantic - Norfolk, Virginia
Location: Norfolk Scope Host: Old Dominion University

Third Place - Baltimore 77, Morgan State 76

South - Chattanooga, Tennessee
Location: Maclellan Gymnasium Host: University of Tennessee at Chattanooga

Third Place - Armstrong Atlantic 110, Alabama State 78

Great Lakes - Charleston, Illinois
Location: Lantz Arena Host: Eastern Illinois University

Third Place - Eastern Illinois 86, Youngstown State 80

*denotes each overtime played

National Finals - Evansville, Indiana
Location: Roberts Municipal Stadium Host: University of Evansville

Third Place - Assumption 88, Tennessee State 80

*denotes each overtime played

All-tournament team
 Paul Brennan (Assumption)
 Joey Caruthers (Old Dominion)
 John Grochowalski (Assumption)
 Wilbur Holland (New Orleans)
 Wilson Washington (Old Dominion)

See also
1975 NCAA Division I basketball tournament
1975 NCAA Division III basketball tournament
1975 NAIA Basketball Tournament

References

Sources
 2010 NCAA Men's Basketball Championship Tournament Records and Statistics: Division II men's basketball Championship
 1975 NCAA Division II men's basketball tournament jonfmorse.com

NCAA Division II men's basketball tournament
Tournament
NCAA Division II basketball tournament
NCAA Division II basketball tournament